Campbell County Public Schools is a school district which serves Campbell County, Virginia, United States. It is based in Rustburg, Virginia. The superintendent is Dr. Robert Johnson.

Schools
Altavista Elementary School
Altavista Combined School
Brookneal Elementary School
Brookville Middle School
Brookville High School
Concord Elementary School
Cornerstone Learning Center
Leesville Road Elementary School
Rustburg Elementary School
Rustburg Middle School
Rustburg High School
Tomahawk Elementary School
Campbell County Technical Center
William Campbell Combined School
Yellow Branch Elementary School

External links
Campbell County Public Schools Official site

Education in Campbell County, Virginia
School divisions in Virginia